Tunas Bangsa Stadium is a multi-purpose stadium in Lhokseumawe, Indonesia.  It is currently used mostly for football matches and is used as the home venue for PSLS Lhokseumawe of the Indonesian Premier League. This stadium holds 20,000 spectators and opened in 1996.

See also
 List of stadiums in Indonesia

References 

Football venues in Indonesia
Multi-purpose stadiums in Indonesia
Buildings and structures in Aceh